The Four Seasons Hotel Moscow is a modern luxury hotel in Manezhnaya Square in the Tverskoy District, central Moscow, Russia. It opened on October 30, 2014, with a facade that replicates the Soviet Hotel Moskva of the 1930s, which previously stood on the same location. It is located near Red Square, and in close proximity to the pre-Revolutionary City Hall.

It was operated by Four Seasons Hotels and Resorts from its opening until 2022, when the chain ceased managing the hotel due to economic sanctions resulting from the Russian invasion of Ukraine. The hotel continues to use the name, though it is no longer part of the international chain.

History

Original structure
The first Hotel Moskva was built in sections from 1932 to 1938. The partially-completed hotel opened in December 1935. Designed by Alexey Shchusev, it was built to be one of Moscow's finest hotels and was lavishly decorated with works of art and mosaics.

The hotel was notable for its use of two different designs for the wings off the central structure. The most popular (possibly apocryphal) explanation is that Shchusev submitted a single conceptual drawing of the façade to Stalin, with one half showing one design option and the other half a different design option for the wings of the building. According to the story, Stalin signed off on the drawing, without noticing the two options. Afraid of informing Stalin that he had failed to select a design, the decision was made to simply construct one wing of each design option, on either side of the building. One included large windows and a more ornate façade, while the other maintained the smaller windows and simpler details of the rest of the hotel's façade. The lobby of the original hotel contained an entrance to the Moscow Metro Okhotny Ryad station. Anti-aircraft guns were installed atop the hotel during the Battle of Moscow. The label of Stolichnaya vodka features a line drawing of the hotel. The Hotel Moskva was expanded in 1977, for the 60th anniversary of the October Revolution. A new 6-story wing was built in the rear, facing Revolution Square, and entirely filling the city block. The Hotel Moskva was demolished in 2004.

Modern Structure
The original structure had become too dated to serve the needs of a first class hotel, so it was completely demolished and replaced with a replica, which added modern facilities inside and an underground parking garage. The first portion of the new complex, facing Revolution Square, was built on the site of the dismantled 1977 wing. Housing offices and a shopping center, Fashion Season, it opened in 2012. 

The hotel portion, on the site of the 1935 building, replicates the iconic facade, following Shchusev's exterior plans as accurately as possible. It opened on October 25, 2014 as the Four Seasons Hotel Moscow.

As of 2016, Russian businessman Alexey Khotin owned the hotel. Four Seasons Hotels ceased managing the hotel in March 2022, due to economic sanctions following the Russian invasion of Ukraine, but the hotel continues to use their name, although it is no longer associated with the chain.

Gallery

See also

References

External links

Official website 

Hotels in Moscow
Defunct hotels in Russia
Hotels built in the Soviet Union
Demolished buildings and structures in Moscow
Hotels established in 1935
Hotels established in 2014
Hotel buildings completed in 2014
1935 establishments in the Soviet Union
Tverskoy District
Stalinist architecture